Steel Magnolias is a 1989 American comedy-drama film directed by Herbert Ross.

Steel Magnolias may also refer to:
 Steel Magnolias (play), a 1987 comedy–drama play by Robert Harling
 Steel Magnolias (2012 film), a 2012 American comedy-drama television film directed by Kenny Leon
 Birmingham Steel Magnolias, professional Women's Football Association team which played in the 2002–2003 season

See also 

 Steel Magnolia, American country music duo
 Steel Magnolia (EP), their self-titled extended play, released in 2010
 Steel Magnolia (album), their self-titled debut studio album, released in 2011